The 2008 United States presidential election in Utah took place on November 4, 2008. It was part of the 2008 United States presidential election. Voters chose five representatives, or electors to the Electoral College, who voted for president and vice president.

Utah was won by Republican nominee John McCain by a 28.02% margin of victory. Prior to the election, all 17 news organizations considered this a state McCain would win, or otherwise considered as a safe red state. Highlighting its status as a GOP bastion, the Beehive State gave McCain one of his largest victories over Democrat Barack Obama, a near two-to-one margin. Obama did, however, manage to carry three counties, and he greatly improved on John Kerry's performance in 2004.

Primaries
 2008 Utah Democratic presidential primary
 2008 Utah Republican presidential primary

Campaign

Predictions
There were 16 news organizations who made state-by-state predictions of the election. Here are their last predictions before election day:

Polling

McCain won every pre-election poll conducted in this state, each with a double-digit margin and with at least 55% of the vote. The final three-poll average showed McCain leading 59% to 31%.

Fundraising
John McCain raised a total of $1,165,621 in the state. Barack Obama raised $2,121,563.

Advertising and visits
Obama spent $297,645. McCain spent just $250. Neither campaign visited the state.

Analysis
Utah is a heavily Republican state that has not voted for a Democratic presidential nominee since Lyndon B. Johnson's landslide in 1964, and even then the margin of victory was small. Johnson is also the last Democrat to manage even 40 percent of Utah's popular vote. The majority of the state's population is Mormon and highly conservative, especially on social issues. Utah gave George W. Bush his largest margin of victory in 2004 over John Kerry, as Bush received over 71 percent to Kerry's 26 percent and carried every county in the state.

With 62.15 percent of the popular vote, Utah proved to be McCain's third strongest state in the 2008 election after Oklahoma and neighboring Wyoming.

Although McCain easily won Utah in 2008, Obama did very well for a Democrat in this Republican stronghold. Obama was able to reduce McCain's margin of victory by narrowly winning Salt Lake County, the state's most populous county that contains the state capital of Salt Lake City, by a mere 296 votes–the first time a Democrat had carried that county since 1964. Obama also carried Summit and Grand counties, both of which have significantly lower Mormon populations than the rest of the state.

Election 2008 proved to be remarkable as it was a Democratic presidential nominee's best showing in the Beehive State since 1968. In substantially Native American and non-Mormon – but historically heavily Republican – San Juan County, Obama's performance was the best by a Democratic presidential candidate since Franklin D. Roosevelt in 1940.

During the same election, popular incumbent Republican Governor Jon Huntsman, Jr. was reelected to a second term in a massive landslide victory, taking in 77.74 percent of the vote over Democrat Bob Springmeyer's 19.65 percent and Libertarian Dell Schanze's 2.62 percent. At the state level, however, Democrats did manage to pick up two seats in the Utah House of Representatives.

Results

Results by county

Counties that flipped from Republican to Democratic 
 Grand (largest municipality: Moab)
 Salt Lake (largest city: Salt Lake City)
 Summit (largest city: Park City)

By congressional district
John McCain swept all 3 of the state's congressional districts, including one held by a Democrat.

Electors

Technically the voters of Utah cast their ballots for electors: representatives to the Electoral College. Utah is allocated 5 electors because it has 3 congressional districts and 2 senators. All candidates who appear on the ballot or qualify to receive write-in votes must submit a list of 5 electors, who pledge to vote for their candidate and his or her running mate. Whoever wins the majority of votes in the state is awarded all 5 electoral votes. Their chosen electors then vote for president and vice president. Although electors are pledged to their candidate and running mate, they are not obligated to vote for them. An elector who votes for someone other than his or her candidate is known as a faithless elector.

The electors of each state and the District of Columbia met on December 15, 2008, to cast their votes for president and vice president. The Electoral College itself never meets as one body. Instead the electors from each state and the District of Columbia met in their respective capitols.

The following were the members of the Electoral College from the state. All 5 were pledged to John McCain and Sarah Palin:
Scott Simpson
Richard Snelgrove
Stan Lockhart
Enid Greene-Mickelesen
Mark Shurtleff

See also
 United States presidential elections in Utah
 Presidency of Barack Obama

References

Utah
2008
2008 Utah elections